Iban García del Blanco (born 1977) is a Spanish politician and chess player who was elected as a Member of the European Parliament in 2019.

Early life and education 
Born on 8 February 1977 in León, García del Blanco earned a licentiate degree in Law from the University of León.

Political career

Career in local politics 
García del Blanco served as León municipal councillor, provincial deputy in León and Senator.

Member of the European Parliament, 2019–present 
García del Blanco stood as candidate for the 2019 European election in Spain, included sixth in the PSOE list. Elected as member of the European Parliament, he joined the Committee on Legal Affairs.

In addition to his committee assignments, García del Blanco is part of the Spinelli Group and the European Parliament Intergroup on Artificial Intelligence and Digital.

References

Living people
MEPs for Spain 2019–2024
Spanish Socialist Workers' Party MEPs
1977 births
Spanish municipal councillors
Members of the Senate of Spain